10th TFCA Awards
December 19, 2006

Best Film: 
 The Queen 
The 10th Toronto Film Critics Association Awards, honoring the best in film for 2006, were given on 19 December 2006.

Winners
Best Actor:
Sacha Baron Cohen - Borat: Cultural Learnings of America for Make Benefit Glorious Nation of Kazakhstan 
Runners-Up: Ryan Gosling – Half Nelson and Forest Whitaker – The Last King of Scotland

Best Actress: 
Helen Mirren - The Queen
Runners-Up: Penélope Cruz – Volver and Judi Dench – Notes on a Scandal

Best Animated Film: 
Happy Feet
Runners-Up: Over the Hedge and A Scanner Darkly

Best Canadian Film: 
Manufactured Landscapes
Runners-Up: The Journals of Knud Rasmussen, Monkey Warfare and Six Figures

Best Director (tie): 
Jean-Pierre and Luc Dardenne - L'Enfant
Stephen Frears - The Queen
Runners-Up: Paul Greengrass – United 93 and Martin Scorsese – The Departed

Best Documentary Film: 
Manufactured Landscapes
Runners-Up: Deliver Us from Evil and An Inconvenient Truth

Best Film: 
The Queen
Runners-Up: The Departed and United 93

Best First Feature: 
Thank You for Smoking 
Runners-Up: Brick and Little Miss Sunshine

Best Foreign Language Film: 
L'Enfant • Belgium
Runners-Up: Pan's Labyrinth • Mexico/Spain and Volver • Spain

Best Screenplay: 
The Queen - Peter Morgan
Runners-Up: Babel – Guillermo Arriaga and The Departed – William Monahan

Best Supporting Actor: 
Michael Sheen - The Queen
Runners-Up: Danny Huston – The Proposition and Mark Wahlberg – The Departed

Best Supporting Actress: 
Cate Blanchett - Notes on a Scandal
Runners-Up: Jennifer Hudson – Dreamgirls and Rinko Kikuchi – Babel

References

2006
2006 film awards
2006 in Toronto
2006 in Canadian cinema